The Archaeological Museum of Termez is a museum in the city of Termez, modern Uzbekistan. The artifacts contained in the museum are mainly linked to the Graeco-Bactrian and Kushan periods. Some artifacts, such as the seated Buddha under the Bodhi tree or head of the Kushan prince are actually copies, the original of which are located in the History Museum of Tashkent and in the Hermitage Museum in Saint-Petersburg.

There are also scale models of the archaeological sites of Salalli Tepe, Kampyr Tepe, Khalchayan, Balalyk Tepe and Fayaz Tepe.

A famous mural, the so-called "Princess of Tokharistan", was found at Tavka Kurgan in Shirabad.

References

Archaeology of Uzbekistan
Archaeological museums
Museums in Uzbekistan
Surxondaryo Region